

This is a list of the National Register of Historic Places listings in Suffolk County, Massachusetts.

This is intended to be a complete list of the properties and districts on the National Register of Historic Places in Suffolk County, Massachusetts, United States. Latitude and longitude coordinates are provided for many National Register properties and districts; these locations may be seen together in a map.

There are 347 properties and districts listed on the National Register in the county, including 58 National Historic Landmarks. The city of Boston is the location of more than 300 of these properties and districts, including 57 National Historic Landmarks; they are listed separately. Properties and districts located in the county's other three municipalities are listed here.

Current listings
For reasons of length, the Boston list has been split into northern and southern listings, divided by the Massachusetts Turnpike. Northern Boston has 147 of these listings, including 39 districts, 48 landmarks, and three National Historic Landmark Districts. Southern Boston, including locations in Boston Harbor, has 175 listings, including 46 districts, 12 landmarks, and one National Historic Landmark District. Two historic districts overlap into both northern and southern Boston: milestones that make up the 1767 Milestones are found in both areas, and the Olmsted Park System extends through much of the city.

Boston

Other municipalities

|}

References

Suffolk County